2Pac Live is a live album by American rapper Tupac Shakur. It was released on August 10, 2004, by Koch Records and is Shakur's first-ever live album.

Track listing

Chart history 
Album

References 

Live albums published posthumously
2004 live albums
Tupac Shakur live albums
Death Row Records live albums
E1 Music live albums
Live gangsta rap albums